Chanakhchi or Avetaranots is a village in the Khojaly District of Azerbaijan, in the disputed region of Nagorno-Karabakh. The village had an ethnic Armenian-majority population prior to the 2020 Nagorno-Karabakh war, and also had an Armenian majority in 1989.

History 
The village is the birthplace of Valerian Madatov (1782–1829), an Armenian melik (prince) in the Principality of Varanda, and later lieutenant general of the Russian Empire.

During the Soviet period, the village was a part of the Askeran District of the Nagorno-Karabakh Autonomous Oblast. The village was administrated by the breakaway Republic of Artsakh as part of its Askeran Province after the First Nagorno-Karabakh War. The village was captured by Azerbaijani forces on 9 November 2020, during the 2020 Nagorno-Karabakh war.

Historical heritage sites 
Historical heritage sites in and around the village include tombs from the 2nd–1st millennia BCE, a 12th/13th-century khachkar, the monastery of Kusanats Anapat built in 1616, the church of Surb Astvatsatsin built in 1651, the 17th/18th-century Chanakhchi Fortress, and a 19th-century cemetery.

Demographics 
The village had 1,039 inhabitants in 2005, and 1,121 inhabitants in 2015.

Gallery

References

External links 
 

Populated places in Khojaly District
Nagorno-Karabakh
Former Armenian inhabited settlements